Oregon House is an unincorporated community in Yuba County, California.

The settlement grew up around a travelers' rest stop built in 1852. A post office was established at Oregon House in 1854, closed in 1902, and reopened in 1903.

New Bullards Bar Dam, one of the tallest dams in the United States, is about 6 miles away.

References

 

Unincorporated communities in California
Populated places established in 1852
Unincorporated communities in Yuba County, California
1852 establishments in California